Gorreana is a Portuguese company headquartered in São Miguel Island, Azores. In operation since 1883, it is the oldest tea plantation in Europe. The company produces black and green tea. Green and black tea plantations were introduced to the island in the 19th century, from seeds brought by ships returning from the Eastern world and with the help of technical expertise provided by a Chinese man called Lau-a-Pan and his interpreter Lau-a-Teng. By the early 20th century, 10 separate factories and almost 50 tea plantations were thriving on the island.

References

External links
Official website

Companies of Portugal
Tea companies
Tea brands
1883 establishments in Portugal
Companies established in 1883
Tourist attractions in the Azores
Tea estates